Teacher Education and Special Education is a quarterly peer-reviewed academic journal that covers the field of education of children with disabilities. The editor-in-chief is Laurie deBettencourt (Johns Hopkins University). It was established in 1977 and is published by SAGE Publications in association with the Teacher Education Division of the Council for Exceptional Children.

Abstracting and indexing 
The journal is abstracted and indexed in:
 ASSIA - Applied Social Sciences Index & Abstracts
 Educational Research Abstracts Online
 ERIC
 Exceptional Child Education Resources
 Wilson Education Index

External links 
 

SAGE Publishing academic journals
English-language journals
Special education journals
Quarterly journals
Publications established in 1977